Marcus Garland is a 1925 race film directed, written, produced and distributed by Oscar Micheaux. The film offers a harsh parody on the rise and fall of Marcus Garvey, the Black nationalist and pan-Africanist leader. Few details on the film’s production survive, and some sources place its release in 1928.

No print of the film is known to exist and it is presumed to be a lost film.

References

External links

Marcus Garland at Internet Movie Database

1925 films
Lost American films
Films directed by Oscar Micheaux
American black-and-white films
American silent feature films
Race films
1925 drama films
Silent American drama films
1925 lost films
Lost drama films
1920s American films